22577 Alfiuccio, provisional designation , is a stony Flora asteroid from the inner regions of the asteroid belt, approximately 2.4 kilometers in diameter. It was discovered on 30 April 1998, by the Lowell Observatory Near-Earth-Object Search at Anderson Mesa Station in Flagstaff, Arizona, United States. It was named in memory of Alfio Grasso, an Italian boy from Sicily.

Orbit and classification 

Alfiuccio is a member of the Flora family, one of the largest families of stony asteroids. It orbits the Sun in the inner main-belt at a distance of 1.9–2.6 AU once every 3 years and 6 months (1,266 days). Its orbit has an eccentricity of 0.15 and an inclination of 4° with respect to the ecliptic.

The asteroid's observation arc begins 20 months prior to its official discovery observation, with a precovery taken at the Chinese Xinglong Station in December 1996.

Physical characteristics

Lightcurve 

In December 2010, a rotational lightcurve of Alfiuccio was obtained from photometric observations in the R-band at the Palomar Transient Factory, California. Lightcurve analysis gave a rotation period of  hours with a brightness variation of 0.36 magnitude.

Diameter and albedo estimate 

The Collaborative Asteroid Lightcurve Link assumes an albedo of 0.24 – derived from 8 Flora, the largest member and namesake of its orbital family – and calculates a diameter of 2.4 kilometers, based on a weaker absolute magnitude of 15.27.

Naming 

This minor planet was named in memory of Alfio "Alfiuccio" Grasso (1992–2004) who died in a hunting accident on the slopes of Mount Etna, Italy. The body's name was proposed by C. Blanco and M. Di Martino. The official naming citation was published by the Minor Planet Center on 6 August 2009.

References

External links 
 Asteroid Lightcurve Database (LCDB), query form (info )
 Dictionary of Minor Planet Names, Google books
 Asteroids and comets rotation curves, CdR – Observatoire de Genève, Raoul Behrend
 Discovery Circumstances: Numbered Minor Planets (20001)-(25000) – Minor Planet Center
 
 

022577
022577
Named minor planets
19980430